The Ulaanbaatar trolleybus system forms part of the public transport network in Ulaanbaatar, the capital city of Mongolia.  It is Mongolia's only trolleybus system.

History
Opened on 29 October 1987, the system was originally operated by about 40 ZiU-9 type trolleybuses, imported from the then Soviet Union.  Since 2007, newer trolleybuses have joined the fleet.

Lines 
The system is made up of the following lines: 2, 4 and 5.

Fleet 
The ZiU-9 type trolleybuses continue to be the mainstay of the fleet.  In 2007, they were joined by several Hyundai Aero City 540 vehicles, converted from diesel power using electrical equipment removed from some of the ZiU-9s.  A small number of additional ZiU trolleybuses, and two AKSM trolleybuses, have also been added to the fleet.

Due to their strength, the trolleybuses have been nicknamed "goat carts" by Ulaanbaatar residents.

See also

List of trolleybus systems

References

External links

 
 
Transport in Ulaanbaatar
Ulan Bator
Ulan Bator